The 1994 Senior League World Series took place from August 14–20 in Kissimmee, Florida, United States. Brandon, Florida defeated Midland, Michigan in the championship game.

Teams

Results

Winner's Bracket

Loser's Bracket

Placement Bracket

Elimination Round

References

Senior League World Series
Senior League World Series
Senior League